Praxiteles is a crater on Mercury.  It is one of 110 peak ring basins on Mercury.

MESSENGERs high-resolution images obtained during the mission's second Mercury flyby have revealed a number of irregularly shaped depressions on the floor of Praxiteles crater, making it a pit-floor crater. The colors near these depressions in wide angle camera (WAC) images are similar to those near volcanoes discovered during the mission's first Mercury flyby along the inner edge of the Caloris basin. The similar colors and the association with the irregular depressions (possible volcanic vents) are suggestive of past volcanic activity on the floor of Praxiteles.

The light coloration associated with the peak ring is now known as Orm Facula.

Praxiteles crater, first observed by Mariner 10, was named in 1979 by the IAU after the ancient Greek sculptor Praxiteles.

Hollows
Hollows are abundant on the floor of Praxiteles.

References

Impact craters on Mercury